Kenneth Marshall (born 1950), is an American actor

Kenneth Marshall may also refer to:

Kenneth Marshall (cricketer) (born 1935), South African cricketer
Kenneth Marshall (politician) (born 1968), American politician 
Kenneth Walker Marshall (1911–1992), Scottish international rugby and cricket player

See also
Ken Marschall (born 1950), American painter